Big Sandy Petrel Island is an island game reserve with an area of 15.2 ha, in south-eastern Australia.  It is part of the Petrel Island Group, lying in Bass Strait close to Walker and Robbins Islands in north-west Tasmania.

Fauna
Recorded breeding seabird, shorebird and waterbird species include little penguin, short-tailed shearwater, Pacific gull, sooty oystercatcher, pied oystercatcher and Cape Barren goose. Tiger snakes are present.

References

Islands of Tasmania